WMVO (1300 AM) – branded as "Oldies WMVO" – is a commercial oldies radio station licensed to serve Mount Vernon, Ohio. It also operates a translator signal on 100.9 MHz at the same landmark site: "Radio Hill" (at the intersection of Coshocton Avenue and Upper Gilchrist Road). The station is a full-service oldies station that also features assorted talk and sports programming. WMVO is also an ABC News Radio affiliate.

WMVO and its FM sister station WQIO are currently owned by BAS Broadcasting of Fremont, Ohio. Prior to October 1, 2005, the station was owned by Clear Channel Communications. WMVO has maintained its local presence for much of the station's history, with an additional news presence on WQIO.

WMVO is affiliated with the Cleveland Guardians, Cleveland Cavaliers, Ohio State Buckeyes and the Mount Vernon Yellow Jackets.

History
WMVO and sister station WQIO were founded by Helen E. Zelkowitz “Mrs. Z” in 1951 and remained locally owned and operated until their sale in 1994.  Ron Staats nicknamed “The Voice of Knox County”, was the 1300 WMVO OM/Program Director and host of the talk show “Radioline” for 37 years. Ron was an integral part of the community by serving as the announcer for the Mount Vernon Christmas Parade, master of ceremonies for the Knox County Junior Miss program, Utica Old Fashioned Ice Cream Festival and the Dogwood Blossoms Chapter Sweet Adeline’s Christmas Show. Other well known WMVO personalities included Dave ‘Skip’ Bevington (over 40 years) and Charlie Kilkenny. In 1982 long-time radio personality Charlie Kilkenny drove his pickup to the Public Square, where he told his listeners to meet him with food donations for the community food pantry. To this day, the measurement tool for how much food is raised for Food for the Hungry is based on the size of Charlie Kilkenny’s truck.

In 1994 Ashland Broadcasting purchased the stations to pair with WNCO/WNCO-FM in nearby Ashland.  The name of the company was Ohio Radio Group. Ohio Radio Group eventually became a local radio powerhouse, owning 7 stations, including WFXN-FM/102.3—Galion, Ohio, WMAN-FM/98.3—Fredericktown, Ohio and WXXF/107.7—Loudonville, Ohio. In 1996, WQEL and WBCO were added to the company based in Bucyrus, Ohio where they would become sister stations with WFXN-FM and WYNT which was based in nearby Upper Sandusky, Ohio making Ohio Radio Group the largest radio ownership company in Ohio. By the time of the Ohio Radio Group sale in 2000, they owned 4AM and 9FM radio stations. Clear Channel Communications which owned WYHT and WMAN in nearby Mansfield, Ohio had to divest two radio stations which is why WQEL and WBCO in Bucyrus, Ohio are now owned by Saga Communications.

In 2005, Clear Channel spun off WMVO and WQIO to BAS Broadcasting, based out of Fremont, Ohio. Most of WQIO's airstaff (which by then was predominantly voicetracked) and long-time WMVO personality Ron Staats were dismissed with the ownership change. Since then, WMVO has maintained its local programming block during the morning and midday hours up to the present day.

Prior to February 13, 2010, WMVO was an affiliate of ABC Radio/Citadel Media's Timeless satellite channel, which it carried during non-local programming. After that format's shutdown by Citadel, WMVO switched to a relay of The True Oldies Channel.

External links

 https://theplacetobeknoxcounty.wordpress.com/wmvo/

FM translator

MVO